Andrei Glazunov, a Russian and Alaska native Creole, was the leader of the first Russian expedition to explore and establish trade along the Yukon River in the Alaska Interior in 1834.

References

Year of birth missing
Year of death missing
Explorers from the Russian Empire
Russian explorers of North America
Explorers of Alaska